Whatever Happened to Harold Smith? is a 1999 British comedy film directed by Peter Hewitt and written by Ben Steiner. It was filmed in Doncaster and Sheffield.

The cult classic film is a love story set in the 1970s, showing Vince Smith's efforts to date his office colleague Joanna Robinson.  Vince attempts to get her to join him at the local disco, but unbeknown to him, Joanna is a punk.  This happens against a backdrop of Vince's father Harold becoming a minor celebrity due to his psychic powers, essentially forms of mind reading and telekinesis.

Cast 
 Tom Courtenay - Harold Smith
 Michael Legge - Vincent Smith
 Lulu - Irene Smith
 Laura Fraser - Joanna Robinson
 Stephen Fry - Dr. Peter Robinson
 Charlotte Roberts - Lucy Robinson
 Amanda Root - Margaret Robinson
 David Thewlis - Nesbit
 Charlie Hunnam - Daz
 James Corden - Walter

External links
 
 
 Teaser trailer

1999 films
Films set in Sheffield
Films set in the 1970s
British comedy films
1999 comedy films
Films directed by Peter Hewitt
Films scored by Harry Gregson-Williams
Films shot in Sheffield
1990s English-language films
1990s British films